Milledgeville is a city in and the county seat of Baldwin County in the U.S. state of Georgia. It is northeast of Macon and bordered on the east by the Oconee River. The rapid current of the river here made this an attractive location to build a city. It was the capital of Georgia from 1804 to 1868, including during the American Civil War. Milledgeville was preceded as the capital city by Louisville and was succeeded by Atlanta, the current capital. Today U.S. Highway 441 connects Milledgeville to Madison, Athens, and Dublin.

As of April 1, 2020, the population of Milledgeville was 17,070 down from 17,715 at the 2010 US Census.

Milledgeville is along the route of the Fall Line Freeway, which is under construction to link Milledgeville with Augusta, Macon, Columbus, and other Fall Line cities. They have long histories from the colonial era of Georgia.

Milledgeville is the principal city of the Milledgeville Micropolitan Statistical Area, a micropolitan area that includes Baldwin and Hancock counties. It had a combined population of 52,534 at the 2020 census. The Old State Capitol is located here; it was added to the National Register of Historic Places (NRHP). Much of the original city is contained within the boundaries of the Milledgeville Historic District, which was also added to the NRHP.

History 

Milledgeville, named after Georgia governor John Milledge (in office 1802–1806), was founded by European Americans at the start of the 19th century as the new centrally located capital of the state of Georgia. It served as the state capital from 1804 to 1868.

In 1803 an act of the Georgia legislature called for the establishment and survey of a town to be named in honor of the current governor, John Milledge. The Treaty of Fort Wilkinson (1802) had recently forced Native American tribes to cede territory immediately west of the Oconee River. The white population of Georgia continued to press west and south in search of new farmland. The town of Milledgeville was developed in an area that had long been occupied by indigenous peoples.

In December 1804 the state legislature declared Milledgeville the new capital of Georgia. The new planned town, modeled after Savannah and Washington, D.C., stood on the edge of the frontier at the Atlantic fall line, where the Upper Coastal Plain meets the foothills and plateau of the Piedmont. The survey also included four public squares of  each.

Life in the antebellum capital 

After 1815 Milledgeville became increasingly prosperous and more respectable. Wealth and power gravitated toward the capital. Much of the surrounding countryside was developed by slave labor for cotton plantations, which was the major commodity crop of the South. Cotton bales regularly were set up to line the roads, waiting to be shipped downriver to Darien.

Public-spirited citizens such as Tomlinson Fort (mayor of Milledgeville, 1847–1848) promoted better newspapers, learning academies, and banks. In 1837-1842 the Georgia Lunatic Asylum (later the Central State Hospital) was built here. Oglethorpe University, where the poet Sidney Lanier was later educated, opened its doors in 1838. (The college, forced to close in 1862 during the war, was rechartered in 1913. It moved its campus to Atlanta.)

The cotton boom in this upland area significantly increased the demand for slave labor. The town market, where slave auctions took place, was located on Capital Square, next to the Presbyterian church. Skilled black carpenters, masons, and laborers were forced to construct most of the handsome antebellum structures in Milledgeville.

Two events epitomized Milledgeville's status as the political and social center of Georgia in this period:

 In 1825 the capital was visited by American Revolutionary War hero and aristocrat, the Marquis de Lafayette. The receptions, barbecue, formal dinner, and grand ball for the veteran apostle of liberty seemed to mark Milledgeville's coming of age. 
The Governor's Mansion was constructed (1836-38/39); it was one of the most important examples of Greek revival architecture in America.

By 1854 Baldwin County had a total population of 8,148, of whom 3,566 were free (mostly white), and 4,602 were African-American slaves.

American Civil War and its aftermath 

On January 19, 1861, Georgia convention delegates passed the Ordinance of Secession, and on February 4, 1861, the "Republic of Georgia" joined the Confederate States of America. In November 1864 Union general William T. Sherman and 30,000 Union troops marched into Milledgeville during his March to the Sea. Before leaving a couple of days later, they poured sorghum and molasses down the pipes of the organ at St. Stephen's Episcopal Church.

In 1868, during Reconstruction, the state legislature moved the capital to Atlanta—a city emerging as the symbol of the New South as surely as Milledgeville symbolized the Old South.

Milledgeville struggled to survive as a city after losing the business of the capital. The energetic efforts of local leaders established the Middle Georgia Military and Agricultural College (later Georgia Military College) in 1879 on Statehouse Square. Where the crumbling remains of the old penitentiary stood, Georgia Normal and Industrial College (later Georgia College & State University) was founded in 1889. In part because of these institutions, as well as Central State Hospital, Milledgeville developed as a less provincial town than many of its neighbors.

Twentieth century to present 
The lake community became an increasingly important part of the town's social and economic identity.

In the 1980s and 1990s Milledgeville began to capitalize on its heritage by revitalizing the downtown and historic district. It encouraged restoration of historic buildings and an urban design scheme on Main Street to emphasize its character.

By 2000 the population of Milledgeville and Baldwin County combined had grown to 44,700. Community leaders have made concerted efforts to create a more diversified economic base, striving to wean the old capital from its dependence on government institutions such as Central State Hospital and state prisons. The state has recently closed some prisons and reduced jobs at Central State, due to tightening state budgets.

Geography 

U.S. Route 441 is the main route through the city, leading north  to  Eatonton and south  to Irwinton. Georgia State Routes 22, 24, and 49 also run through the city as well. GA-22 leads northeast  to Sparta and southwest  to Gray. GA-24 leads east  to Sandersville and north to Eatonton with U.S. 441. GA-49 leads southwest  to Macon.

Milledgeville is located on the Atlantic Seaboard fall line of the United States. The Oconee River flows a half mile east of downtown on its way south to the Altamaha River and then south to the Atlantic Ocean.

This historic area was laid out in 1803, with streets named after other counties in Georgia.

Climate

Demographics

2020 census

As of the 2020 United States census, there were 17,070 people, 5,895 households, and 2,852 families residing in the city.

2010 census
The population of the town of Milledgeville was 17,715 at the 2010 census.

2000 census
As of the census of 2000, there were 18,757 people, 4,755 households, and 2,643 families residing in the city, although a 2005 study estimates there to be a population of 19,397. The racial makeup of the city was 49.94% White, 47.68% African American, 0.13% Native American, 1.55% Asian, 0.01% Pacific Islander, 0.20% from other races, and 0.50% from two or more races. Hispanic or Latino people of any race were 1.23% of the population.

There were 4,755 households, out of which 25.9% had children under the age of 18 living with them, 33.6% were married couples living together, 18.7% had a female householder with no husband present, and 44.4% were non-families. 31.7% of all households were made up of individuals, and 10.7% had someone living alone who was 65 years of age or older. The average household size was 2.35 and the average family size was 3.04.

In the city, the population was spread out, with 16.0% under the age of 18, 20.9% from 18 to 24, 32.3% from 25 to 44, 19.6% from 45 to 64, and 11.2% who were 65 years of age or older. The median age was 33 years. For every 100 females, there were 166.0 males. For every 100 females age 18 and over, there were 173.2 males.

The median income for a household in the city was $30,484, and the median income for a family was $44,683. Males had a median income of $30,794 versus $23,719 for females. The per capita income for the city was $12,782. About 14.8% of families and 24.0% of the population were below the poverty line, including 28.8% of those under age 18 and 16.3% of those age 65 or over.

Government 
The Milledgeville City Council is the city's legislative body, with the power to enact all ordinances and resolutions and controls the funding of all designated programs. Six council members are elected to represent their district, while the mayor is elected at-large, by city voters, for a four-year term.

City Council meetings are held on the second and fourth Tuesday of the month. Meetings are open to the public and televised locally on MBC TV-4 Milledgeville/Baldwin County Governmental/Educational Access Cable Channel on local Charter Communications.

In the November 2017 general election, incumbent Mayor Gary Thrower was defeated by Mary Parham-Copelan. She was sworn in as the city's first African-American female mayor on December 29, 2017.

Elected officials :

Educational institutions, colleges and universities 
Milledgeville's public school system is governed by the Baldwin County School District.

Public elementary schools 
Lakeview Academy 
Lakeview Primary
Midway Hills Academy
Midway Hills Primary

Public middle school 
Oak Hill Middle School

Public high school 
Baldwin High School

Private schools 
Georgia Military College prep school (grades K–12)
John Milledge Academy (grades K–12)

Schools for higher education 

Central Georgia Technical College
Georgia College & State University (commonly known as Georgia College)
Georgia Military College

Libraries 
Milledgeville's public library system is part of the Twin Lakes Library System. Mary Vinson Memorial Library is located downtown. Georgia College & State University also has a library.

Historic schools 
The school system building facilities were revamped during the 1990s and first decade of the 21st century, with all new buildings, including a new Board of Education office. This required relocation and merging of older schools. The concept of a middle school was introduced, whereas previously 6th through 9th grades were housed in separate schools. Closed older schools include:
Northside Elementary School (now a shopping center) 
Southside Elementary School (now a church) 
West End Elementary School (torn down) 
Harrisburg Elementary School (torn down) 
Baldwin Middle School (was located in old Baldwin High School) no
Boddie Junior High School (8th and 9th grades)
Baldwin High School (old location)
Carver Elementary School (5th and 6th grades / now an alternate school)
Sallie Davis Middle School (7th grade)

Transportation

Major roads

  U.S. Route 441
U.S. Route 441 Business
  State Route 22
  State Route 49

Pedestrians and cycling

 Oconee River Greenway

Notable people 

Melvin Adams, Jr, better known as Fish Scales from the band Nappy Roots
Nathan Crawford Barnett, Georgia Secretary of State for more than 30 years
Ella Barksdale Brown, journalist, educator
Kevin Brown, professional baseball player
Javon Bullard, college football player for the University of Georgia
Wally Butts, college football coach
Earnest Byner, professional football player
Lisa D. Cook, American economist
Pete Dexter, novelist, journalist and screenwriter
George Doles, Confederate Brigadier General
Eugenia Tucker Fitzgerald, founder of the first secret society at a girls' college
Tillie K. Fowler, politician
Joel Godard, television announcer
Marjorie Taylor Greene, United States Representative
Willie Greene, professional baseball player
Floyd Griffin, mayor of Milledgeville, state representative, state senator
Oliver Hardy, motion picture comedian
Nick Harper, professional football player
Charles Holmes Herty, academic, scientist and businessman
Leroy Hill, professional football player
Maurice Hurt, professional football player
Edwin Francis Jemison, Civil War soldier who died in battle
Sherrilyn Kenyon, author
Grace Lumpkin, writer
William Gibbs McAdoo, US Secretary of the Treasury
Blind Willie McTell, influential blues guitarist
Bill Miner, Canada's "Gentleman Bandit"
David Brydie Mitchell, the only Gergia Governor buried in Milledgeville
Celena Mondie-Milner, professional track and field player
Powell A. Moore, politician and public servant
Flannery O'Connor, author, honored with a U.S. Postal Service stamp
Ulrich Bonnell Phillips, historian
Barry Reese, writer
Lucius Sanford, professional football player
Tut Taylor, bluegrass musician
Ellis Paul Torrance, psychologist
Larry Turner, professional basketball player
William Usery Jr., labor union activist and U.S. Secretary of Labor
Carl Vinson, congressman
J. T. Wall, professional football player
Rico Washington, professional baseball player
Rondell White, professional baseball player
Robert McAlpin Williamson, Republic of Texas Supreme Court Justice and Texas Ranger

See also 

Bartram Educational Forest
List of municipalities in Georgia
Lockerly Arboretum
National Register of Historic Places listings in Baldwin County, Georgia

References

Further reading

External links 

 Government

 General information

Milledgeville, Georgia at City-Data.com
Milledgeville, Georgia  at New Georgia Encyclopedia
Milledgeville – Baldwin County Convention & Visitors Bureau
Milledgeville Historic Newspapers Archive at Digital Library of Georgia

 
1804 establishments in Georgia (U.S. state)
Cities in Baldwin County, Georgia
Cities in Georgia (U.S. state)
County seats in Georgia (U.S. state)
Former state capitals in the United States

Milledgeville micropolitan area, Georgia
Planned cities in the United States
Populated places established in 1804